The 7.5 FK (C.I.P.) or the 7.5 FK BRNO is a bottlenecked rimless centerfire automatic pistol cartridge developed by the Czech firearms and ammunition manufacturer FK Brno Engineering s.r.o.

History
The 7.5 BRNO was developed between 2009 and 2014, for the specific purpose of providing high capacity automatic pistols the ability to engage combatant targets at a range of between  while retaining more kinetic energy at that range than a 9×19mm Parabellum cartridge can generate at the muzzle/point blank range.

Due to the length of the cartridge, relatively high energy, and the pressure that the cartridge generates, no current high-capacity automatic pistol existed that could accommodate the new caliber. FK BRNO developed a specialized platform to accommodate and use this caliber.

Initially, it was chambered in the all-steel FK BRNO Field Pistol (2015) which had a patented recoil attenuating system, but subsequently FK BRNO developed a polymer version of that design, designated as the FK PSD (2020).

Cartridge dimensions

The 7.5 FK has 1.50 cm3 (23.21 grain of ) cartridge case capacity. Americans would define the shoulder angle at alpha/2 = 30 degrees. The common rifling twist for this cartridge is 270mm (1 in 10.62" inch), 6 grooves, Ø lands = 7.5 mm, Ø grooves = 7.77mm, land width = 3.75 mm, and the primer type is small pistol.

According to C.I.P rulings, the 7.5 FK case can handle up to 350 MPa (50,763 psi) piezo pressure. In C.I.P regulated countries, every pistol cartridge combo has to be proofed at 130% of this maximum C.I.P pressure to certify for sale to consumers.

Characteristics
The goal of the 7.5 FK project was to create a cartridge with a level of performance that could exceed that of the highly effective 125 grain (8.1 g) JHP .357 Magnum load, be at least as effective terminally as the 7.62 x 39 Russian/5.56 NATO cartridges when fired from short barrel AK/AR type platforms, and to provide a package small enough to fit a standard-size military automatic pistol.

More importantly, the 7.5 FK cartridge achieves this without compromising the sectional density of the projectile, which is critical for penetration and stopping power. The 95 grain 7.5 FK cartridge has a sectional density of 0.150 while the 101 grain 7.5 FK cartridge has a sectional density of 0.160. In comparison, the 357 magnum 125 cartridge has a sectional density of 0.140. The higher sectional density allows the 7.5 FK projectile to retain higher velocity and lower trajectory at longer ranges, while having significantly deeper penetration, especially since it has 40% more velocity. Which is essentially almost the same as what the 125 grain JHP 357 magnum generates at point blank range from the same barrel length.

Performance
The table below shows common performance parameters for several common automatic pistol calibers using kinetic energy as the main form of power comparison, using premium high-end ammunition using a 5-inch barrel.

The concept of using kinetic energy tables as a measuring method for incapacitating power has been used for almost a century but has been disputed for almost as long by various different authorities, scholars, and writers as it does not take into account the projectile construction and design which may affect terminal performance significantly. It also does not take into account penetration capability which is highly influence by projectile material, design, and sectional density. Several theories have been published that claim better prediction of incapacitating power than kinetic energy such as Tylor KO index, Hatchers theory, Lethality index, Bekker knock out formula, and Hornady HITS among others. FK BRNO has published their own alternative method which they claim is more efficient and more accurate predictor of incapacitating power which they call Dynamic Shock Index (DSI). They have also published a video showing the 7.5 cartridge being used to hunt large boars where they claim that the terminal ballistics efficiency shown in the video is due to the high DSI of these loads.

Available loads

F9: All copper monolithic wide meplat flat nose. This bullet is designed to create a wide and very deep permanent wound channel in addition to a very high dynamic shock effect. Accurate and effective for defence and medium game hunting up to 300 lbs to 100 yards, and dangerous game up to 500 lbs to 50 yards. 

S95: Jacketed Hollow point made by Sierra bullets exclusively for FKB, it is designed to explode and shatter on impact. This bullet makes huge, but shallower wound channels than the other versions. Accurate and effective for defence and medium game hunting up to 100 lbs at 100 yards.

F5: All copper, monolithic nose discarding hollow point. The nose is designed to break off on impact, leaving a jagged 7mm meplat to create a large deep penetrating wound channel and a High Terminal Effect. Accurate and effective for defence and medium game hunting up to 200 lbs to 100 yards.

F7: All copper, monolithic spoon tip. This bullet is designed to tumble after the initial impact and penetration, creating a very large eliptical and deep penetrating wound channel. Accurate and effective for tactical use up to 150 yards and dangerous game hunting up to 500 lbs to 50 yards.

References

Pistol and rifle cartridges